Temp or Temps may refer to:

 Temperature
 Temporary file, in computing
 Temporary folder 
 Temporary variable
 Temp track, or temp score or temp music, audio used during editing of TV and film production
 Temp, a person engaged in temporary work
 Temp., for tempore, denoting a period during which a person whose exact lifespan is unknown
 Temp (air base), on Kotelny Island, Russia
 TEMP (meteorology), a meteorological code for upper air soundings
 Test and evaluation master plan, in project management
 Persol Holdings, rebranded from Temp Holdings, a Japanese human resource management company
 RT-21 Temp 2S, a Soviet intercontinental ballistic missile 
 TR-1 Temp, a Soviet mobile theatre ballistic missile

See also

 The Temp (disambiguation)
 Template (disambiguation)
 Tempe, Arizona, a city in the U.S.
 Tempo, the speed or pace of a piece of music
 Time (French: temps)
 El Temps, a Valencian news magazine